Roddenberry is a surname. People with the surname include:

 Gene Roddenberry (1921–1991), American scriptwriter and producer, also creator of the Star Trek franchise 
 4659 Roddenberry, an asteroid
 Roddenberry (crater), crater on Mars 
 Majel Barrett-Roddenberry (1932–2008), American actress, wife of Gene Roddenberry
 Rod Roddenberry (born 1974), son of Gene Roddenberry and Majel Barrett-Roddenberry
 Seaborn Roddenbery (1870–1913), U.S. congressman from Georgia